Verlon Marion Biggs (March 16, 1943 – June 7, 1994) was an American football defensive end in the American Football League (AFL) and National Football League (NFL).  He played for the New York Jets (AFL) in Super Bowl III, but felt he didn't receive enough credit for the Jets' playoff win against the Oakland Raiders in the AFL Championship Game that launched them into the Super Bowl.  He played well but sulked until 1971, demanded more money, and wound up signing with George Allen's Washington Redskins.  Always a dominating defensive end, Biggs solidified Allen's defense along with fellow newcomers Diron Talbert, Myron Pottios and Jack Pardee, plus holdovers Pat Fischer, Chris Hanburger, Brig Owens and Mike Bass, and led the Redskins into Super Bowl VII.  His nickname with the Redskins was "Dirty Biggs" because of his extremely physical style of play.

See also
List of American Football League players

References

1943 births
1994 deaths
People from Moss Point, Mississippi
American Football League All-Star players
American football defensive ends
Jackson State Tigers football players
New York Jets players
Washington Redskins players
Deaths from leukemia
American Football League players
Deaths from cancer in Mississippi